Rhachomyces is a genus of fungi in the family Laboulbeniaceae. The genus contains 71 species.

References

External links
Rhachomyces at Index Fungorum

Laboulbeniomycetes